Malik Hamadache (born 6 December 1988) is a French-Algerian rugby union player who currently plays for Section Paloise and is an Algerian international. He plays as a prop.

Playing career
Malik Hamadache was born in Avignon in a family where the practice of rugby is a tradition. His father Boualem, played as a prop for the local club of Sorgues and his elder brother, Laïd, plays Monteux in Fédérale 2, He came through the academy of the Bourgoin-Jallieu and made his debut in the Fédérale 2 aged 18. He is a member of the Algeria national rugby union team which played a friendly match against pro team,  in 2008, before leaving Marseille to join Stade Phocéen in Fédérale 1. He remained there for two seasons, playing in the same team as Jonah Lomu. In 2009, he was again selected by Algeria to play a match against the academy squad of Stade Français, which his team won 19–17. In 2010, he signed with the Cergy Pontoise to play in Fédérale 1. When the team was relegated at the end of the 2010–11 season, he joined the Dijon.

Algeria
Hamadache got his first international cap for Algeria on 26 October 2010 against  in the 2010 CAR Development Trophy in Cairo, Egypt.

References

External links
itsrugby.fr profile

French rugby union players
Algerian rugby union players
Living people
French sportspeople of Algerian descent
1988 births
Section Paloise players
SC Albi players
Rugby union props
Sportspeople from Avignon